Shurṭa is the common Arabic term for police, although its precise meaning is that of a "picked" or elite force. Bodies termed shurṭa were established in the early days of the Caliphate, perhaps as early as the caliphate of Uthman (644–656). In the Umayyad and Abbasid Caliphates, the shurṭa had considerable power, and its head, the ṣāḥib al-shurṭa, was an important official, whether at the provincial level or in the central government. The duties of the shurṭa varied with time and place: it was primarily a police and internal security force and also had judicial functions, but it could also be entrusted with suppressing brigandage, enforcing the ḥisbah, customs and tax duties, rubbish collection, acting as a bodyguard for governors, etc. In the Abbasid East, the chief of police also supervised the prison system. From the 10th century, the importance of the shurṭa declined, along with the power of the central government: the army—now dominated by foreign military castes (ghilmān or mamālīk)—assumed the internal security role, while the cities regained a measure of self-government and appropriated the more local tasks of the shurṭa such as that of the night watch.

See also 
 Qadi
 Mazalim

References

Sources 
 

History of Islam
History of law enforcement
Government of the Abbasid Caliphate
Government of the Umayyad Caliphate
Arabic words and phrases